French involvement in the American Revolutionary War of 1775–1783 began in 1776 when the Kingdom of France secretly shipped supplies to the Continental Army of the Thirteen Colonies when it was established in June 1775. France was a long-term historical rival with the Kingdom of Great Britain, from which the Colonies were attempting to separate.

A Treaty of Alliance between the French and the Continental Army followed in 1778, which led to French money, matériel and troops being sent to the United States. An ignition of a global war with Britain started shortly thereafter. Subsequently, Spain and the Dutch Republic also began to send assistance, which, along with other political developments in Europe, left the British with no allies during the conflict (excluding the Hessians). Spain openly declared war in 1779, and war between British and Dutch followed soon after.

France's help was a major and decisive contribution towards the United States' eventual victory and independence in the war. However, as a cost of participation in the war, France accumulated over 1 billion livres in debt, which significantly strained the nation's finances. The French government's failure to control spending (in combination with other factors) led to unrest in the nation, which eventually culminated in a revolution a few years after the conflict between the US and Great Britain concluded. Relations between France and the United States thereafter deteriorated, leading to the Quasi-War in 1798.

American origins of the conflict

After its defeat in the Seven Years' War in 1763, France lost all of its far holdings in North America. Meanwhile, the American colonists and the British government began to fight over whether Parliament in London or the colonial assemblies had primary responsibility for taxation. As part  of that conflict, the colonists organized the Boston Tea Party in response to a tax on tea. The British government responded by passing the Intolerable Acts, which included the closing of Boston Harbor and the revocation of Massachusetts's colonial charter. This conflict exacerbated tensions further. The ideological conflict escalated into open warfare in 1775, at which point the American patriots revolted against British rule. France, who had been rebuilding their Navy and other forces, saw this as a perfect opportunity to avenge her defeat in the previous war and severely undermine her nemesis.

French involvement

France bitterly resented its loss in the Seven Years' War and sought revenge. It also wanted to strategically weaken Britain. Following the Declaration of Independence, the American Revolution was well received by both the general population and the aristocracy in France. The Revolution was perceived as the incarnation of the Enlightenment Spirit against the "English tyranny." Ben Franklin traveled to France in December 1776 in order to rally the nation's support, and he was welcomed with great enthusiasm. At first, French support was covert: French agents sent the Patriots military aid (predominantly gunpowder) through a company called Rodrigue Hortalez et Compagnie, beginning in the spring of 1776. Estimates place the percentage of French-supplied arms to the Americans in the Saratoga campaign at up to 90%. By 1777, over five million livres of aid had been sent to the American rebels.

Motivated by the prospect of glory in battle or animated by the sincere ideals of liberty and republicanism, volunteers like Pierre Charles L'Enfant joined the American army. The most famous was Lafayette, a charming young aristocrat who defied the king's order and enlisted in 1777 at age 20. He became an aide to George Washington and a combat general. More importantly, he solidified a favorable American view of France. Kramer argues that Lafayette provided a legitimacy for the war and confidence that there was serious European support for independence. Lafayette's personal style was highly attractive; the young man learned quickly, adapted to the Patriot style, avoided politics, and became a fast friend of General Washington. Fifty years later, after a major career in French politics, he returned as a beloved hero of the war.

Debate over quiet aid or declaring open war

Up against the British power, the young nation lacked arms and allies, and so it turned towards France. France was not directly interested in the conflict, but saw it as an opportunity to contest British power by supporting a new British opponent. Through negotiations conducted first by Silas Deane and then by Benjamin Franklin, France began covert support of the patriots' cause.

Secretly approached by Louis XVI and France's foreign minister, the comte de Vergennes, Pierre Beaumarchais was authorized to sell gunpowder and ammunition to the Americans for close to a million pounds under the veil of the French company Rodrigue Hortalez et Compagnie. The aid given by France, much of which passed through the neutral Dutch West Indies port of Sint Eustatius, contributed to George Washington's survival against the British onslaught in 1776 and 1777. The aid was also a major factor in the defeat of General Burgoyne's expedition in the Champlain corridor that ended in a British disaster at Saratoga. French ports accommodated American ships, including privateers and Continental Navy warships, that acted against British merchant ships. France provided significant economic aid, either as donations or loans, and also offered technical assistance, granting some of its military strategists "vacations" so they could assist American troops.

Silas Deane, appointed by the Americans and helped by French animosity towards Britain, obtained unofficial aid, starting in early 1776. However, the goal was the total involvement of France in the war. A new delegation composed of Franklin, Deane, and Arthur Lee, was appointed to lobby for the involvement of European nations. (The British paid Edward Bancroft and Paul Wentworth to spy). Franklin, age 70 and already well known in French intellectual circles for his scientific discoveries, served as the chief diplomat with the title of "minister" (the term "ambassador" was not used). He dressed in rough frontier clothes rather than formal court dress, and met with many leading diplomats, aristocrats, intellectuals, scientists and financiers. Franklin's image and writings caught the French imagination – there were many images of him sold on the market – and he became the image of the archetypal new American and a hero for aspirations for a new order inside France. When the international climate at the end of 1777 had become tenser, Habsburg Austria requested the support of France in the War of the Bavarian Succession against the Prussia in line with the Franco-Austrian Alliance. France refused, causing the relationship with Austria to turn sour. Under these conditions, asking Austria to assist France in a war against the British was impossible. Attempts to rally Spain also failed: Spain did not immediately recognize potential gains, and the American revolutionary spirit was seen as threatening the legitimacy of the Spanish Crown in its own American colonies.

Public opinion in France was in favor of open war, but King Louis and his advisors were reluctant due to the possible risks and heavy expenses involved. The king's economic and military advisors, in particular, remained reluctant. The French Navy was being rapidly rebuilt, but there were doubts as to how ready it was for serious conflict. Financiers Turgot and Necker warned war would be very expensive for France's wobbly system of taxation and finance.

The Americans argued that an alliance of the United States, France, and Spain would assure a rapid defeat of the British, but Vergennes, waiting until his navy was ready, hesitated. On July 23, 1777, Vergennes decided that it was time to decide either total assistance, with war, or abandonment of the new nation. The choice, ratified by the king, was war.

Entry into the war

The British had taken Philadelphia in 1777, but American victory at the Battle of Saratoga brought back hope to the Patriots and enthusiasm in France. The army of Burgoyne surrendered to American forces after Saratoga and France realized that the United States could be victorious. The king directed Vergennes to negotiate an alliance with the Americans.

France formally recognized the United States on February 6, 1778, with the signing of the Treaty of Alliance. Hostilities soon followed after Britain declared war on France on March 17, 1778. The British naval force, then the largest fleet afloat, and French fleet confronted each other from the beginning. The British avoided intercepting a French fleet that left Toulon under the comte d'Estaing in April for North America, fearing the French fleet at Brest might then be used to launch an invasion of Britain. France had kept the Brest fleet to protect commercial shipping in European waters, and it sailed out only after a British fleet was confirmed to have left in pursuit of d'Estaing, thus weakening the British Channel fleet. In spite of this reduction, the British fleet still outnumbered the French fleet at Brest, and Admiral d'Orvilliers was instructed to avoid combat when he sailed in July. D'Orvilliers met the fleet of Admiral Augustus Keppel in the indecisive Battle of Ushant on July 27, after which both fleets returned to port for repairs.

France did consider the landing of 40,000 men in the nearby British Isles but abandoned the idea because of logistical issues. On the continent, France was protected through its alliance with Austria which, even if it did not take part in the American Revolutionary War, affirmed its diplomatic support of France.

Other nations in Europe at first refused to openly join the war but both Spain and the Dutch Republic gave unofficial support to the American cause. Vergennes was able to convince the Spanish to formally enter the war in 1779 and, in 1780, Britain declared war on the Dutch Republic over claims of Dutch violations of neutrality.

North American operations

French participation in North America was initially maritime in nature and marked by some indecision on the part of its military leaders. In 1778, American and French planners organized an attempt to capture Newport, Rhode Island, then under British occupation. The attempt failed, in part because Admiral d'Estaing did not land French troops prior to sailing out of Narragansett Bay to meet the British fleet. He then sailed to Boston after his fleet was damaged in a storm. In 1779, d'Estaing again led his fleet to North America for joint operations, this time against British-held Savannah, Georgia. About 3,000 French joined with 2,000 Americans in the Siege of Savannah, in which a naval bombardment was unsuccessful. An attempted assault of the entrenched British position was repulsed with heavy losses.

Support became more notable when, in 1780, 6,000 soldiers led by Rochambeau landed at Newport, itself abandoned in 1779 by the British, and then established a naval base there. These forces were largely inactive since the fleet was closely watched by the British fleet from its bases in New York and eastern Long Island. By early 1781, with the war dragging on, French military planners were finally convinced that more significant operations would be required in North America to bring a decisive end to the war. That year's West Indies fleet was commanded by the comte de Grasse, and specific arrangements were made to coordinate operations with him. De Grasse asked to be supplied with North American pilots and to be informed of possible operations in North America to which he might contribute. Rochambeau and Washington met in Wethersfield, Connecticut in May 1781 to discuss their options. Washington wanted to drive the British from both New York City and Virginia (the latter led first by Benedict Arnold, then by Brigadier William Phillips and eventually by Charles Cornwallis). Virginia was also seen as a potent threat that could be fought with naval assistance. These two options were dispatched to the Caribbean along with the requested pilots. Rochambeau, in a separate letter, urged de Grasse to come to the Chesapeake Bay for operations in Virginia. Following the Wethersfield conference, Rochambeau moved his army to White Plains, New York and placed his command under Washington.

De Grasse received these letters in July at roughly the same time Cornwallis was preparing to occupy Yorktown, Virginia. De Grasse concurred with Rochambeau and subsequently sent a dispatch indicating that he would reach the Chesapeake at the end of August but that agreements with the Spanish meant he could only stay until mid-October. The arrival of his dispatches prompted the Franco-American army to begin a march for Virginia. De Grasse reached the Chesapeake as planned and his troops were sent to assist Lafayette's army in the blockade of Cornwallis's army. A British fleet sent to confront de Grasse's control of the Chesapeake was defeated by the French on September 5 at the Battle of the Chesapeake and the Newport fleet delivered the French siege train to complete the allied military arrival. The Siege of Yorktown and following surrender by Cornwallis on October 19 were decisive in ending major hostilities in North America.

Other battles

Other important battles between the French and the British were spaced out around the world, from the West Indies to India. France's navy at first dominated in the West Indies, capturing Dominica, Grenada, Saint Vincent, Tobago but losing St. Lucia at the beginning of the war. After the siege of Yorktown the French returned to the West Indies and were successful in taking St. Kitts (despite a naval defeat), Montserrat as well as Demerara and Essequibo in South America by February 1782. A planned Franco-Spanish invasion of Jamaica was aborted after the decisive Battle of the Saintes in 1782. This put French forces on the defensive in the Caribbean although the French captured the Turks and Caicos Islands at the end of the war.

In European waters, France and Spain joined forces with the entry of Spain into the war in 1779. An attempted invasion of Britain was a failure due to a variety of factors. A French invasion of Jersey ended in defeat. French and Spanish forces captured Minorca in February 1782 but the Great Siege of Gibraltar the largest operation of the war from 1779 to 1783, was unsuccessful in either storming the place, or preventing repeated British relief of its garrison.

In India, British troops gained control of French outposts in 1778 and 1779, sparking the Kingdom of Mysore, a longtime French ally, to begin the Second Anglo-Mysore War. Allied with the French, the Mysoreans for a time threatened British positions on the east coast. A French fleet commanded by the Bailli de Suffren fought a series of largely inconclusive battles with a British fleet under Sir Edward Hughes, and the only major military land action, the 1783 Siege of Cuddalore, was cut short by news that a preliminary peace had been signed. The French failed to attain their goal of regaining territories in India that were lost in the Seven Years war. The British fought on with Mysores until that conflict ended as status quo ante bellum in 1784.

Peace negotiations
Because of decisive battles on American soil, the French were in a strong position during the peace negotiations in Paris at the beginning of 1782. Rodney's victory at the Battle of the Saintes back in April however changed all that – news of the French defeat arrived nearly six weeks later in France and was met with dismay. The defeat was costly militarily and financially. The Royal Navy now had the strategic initiative, and as a result British demands at the peace talks greatly strengthened. France was also approaching the limits of its ability to borrow money and now sought a quick end to the war. The defeat also signalled a collapse in the Franco-American alliance – as a result Benjamin Franklin never informed France of the secret negotiations that took place directly between Britain and the United States.

The British position was strengthened even more in September with the destruction of the Franco-Spanish assault on Gibraltar and the garrison's relief by the Royal Navy the following month. A preliminary peace treaty between Great Britain and America was signed on 30 November; Britain acknowledged that the United States owned all the land south of the Great Lakes and east of the Mississippi River, except for Florida (which went to Spain). The French accepted the preliminary with protests but no action. Since France was not included in the American-British peace discussions the influence of France and Spain in future negotiations was limited.

Aftermath

With the Americans split from their allies the war formally ended in September 1783 with the signing of the Treaty of Paris. Losses from the 1763 Treaty of Paris and the Treaty of Utrecht (1713) were not regained. All territories that were captured by the powers were returned except for Tobago and a part of the Senegal River area which were acquired by France who also gained some concessions in the Newfoundland fisheries. Spain managed better having regained Florida and Minorca, but Gibraltar remained in the hands of the British.

Because the French involvement in the war was distant and naval in nature, over a billion livres tournois were spent by the French government to support the war effort, raising its overall debt to about 3.315 billion. The finances of the French state were in disastrous shape and were made worse by Jacques Necker, who, rather than increase taxes, used loans to pay off debts. State secretary of Finances Charles Alexandre de Calonne attempted to fix the deficit problem by asking for the taxation of the property of nobles and clergy but was dismissed and exiled for his ideas. The French instability further weakened the reforms that were essential in the re-establishment of stable French finances. Trade also severely declined during the war, but was revived by 1783.

The war was especially important for the prestige and pride of France, who was reinstated in the role of European arbiter. However, Great Britain, not France, became the leading trading partner of the United States. The French took pride in their cultural influence on the young country through the Enlightenment, as attested by Franklin and Jefferson, and as embodied in the Declaration of Independence in 1776 and the United States Constitution in 1787. In turn, the Revolution influenced France. Liberal elites were satisfied by the victory but there were also some major consequences. European conservative Royalists and nobility had become nervous, and began to take measures in order to secure their positions. On May 22, 1781, the Decree of Ségur closed the military post offices of the upper rank to the common persons, reserving those ranks exclusively for the nobility.

Financial aspects
In all the French spent 1.3 billion livres to support the Americans directly in addition to the money it spent fighting Britain on land and sea outside the U.S.

France's status as a great modern power was re-affirmed by the war, but it was detrimental to the country's finances. Even though France's European territories were not affected, victory in a war against Great Britain with battles like the decisive siege of Yorktown in 1781 had a large financial cost which severely degraded fragile finances and increased the national debt. France gained little except that it weakened its main strategic enemy and gained a new, fast-growing ally that could become a welcome trading partner. However, the trade never materialized, and in 1793 the United States proclaimed its neutrality in the war between Great Britain and the French Republic.

Some historians argue that France primarily sought revenge against Great Britain for the loss of territory in North America and India from the previous conflict. But Jonathan R. Dull states that France intervened because of dispassionate calculation, not because of Anglophobia or a desire to avenge the loss of Canada.

See also
 Pedro Pablo Abarca de Bolea, 10th Count of Aranda
 Benjamin Franklin Bache
 Edward Bancroft
 William Carmichael
 Jacques-Donatien Le Ray de Chaumont
 Anne Emmanuel de Croÿ
 Jacques Barbeu-Dubourg
 Edward Edwards, British spy
 Franco-American alliance
 William Franklin
 William Temple Franklin
 Conrad Alexandre Gérard de Rayneval
 Rodolphe-Ferdinand Grand, banker, along with his brother Georges, to America
 Anne-Catherine de Ligniville, Madame Helvétius
 Ralph Izard
 John Jay
 John Paul Jones
 Anne-César de La Luzerne
 Louis-Léon de Brancas, comte de Lauraguais
 Henry Laurens
 John Laurens
 Antoine Lavoisier
 Jean-Charles-Pierre Lenoir
 Jean-Baptiste Le Roy
 Louis-Guillaume Le Veillard
 List of French units in the American Revolutionary War
 Jean-Frédéric Phélypeaux, comte de Maurepas
 André Morellet
 Antoine de Sartine
 David Murray, 2nd Earl of Mansfield, The Viscount Stormont
 Paul Wentworth
 Lambert Wickes

References

Notes

2008

English
 
 Bemis, Samuel Flagg. The Diplomacy of the American Revolution (1935)
 Brown, John L. "Revolution and the Muse: the American War of Independence in Contemporary French Poetry." William and Mary Quarterly 1984 41(4): 592–614.   
 Brecher, Frank W. Securing American Independence: John Jay and the French Alliance. Praeger Publishers, 2003. Pp. xiv, 327 online
 Chartrand, René, and Back, Francis. The French Army in the American War of Independence Osprey; 1991.
 Corwin, Edward S. French Policy and the American Alliance of 1778 Archon Books; 1962.
 Dull, Jonathan R. A Diplomatic History of the American Revolution; Yale U. Press, 1985.
 Dull, Jonathan R. The French Navy and American Independence: A Study of Arms and Diplomacy 1774–1787 (1975)
 Kaplan, Lawrence S. "The Diplomacy of the American Revolution: the Perspective from France." Reviews in American History 1976 4(3): 385–390. review of Dull (1975) 
 Gottschalk, Louis. Lafayette Comes to America 1935 online; Lafayette Joins the American Army (1937)
 Hoffman, Ronald and Albert, Peter J., ed. Peace and the Peacemakers: The Treaty of 1783. U. Press of Virginia, 1986. 263 pp.
 Hoffman, Ronald and Albert, Peter J., ed. Diplomacy and Revolution: The Franco-American Alliance of 1778. U. Press of Virginia, 1981. 200 pp.
 Hudson, Ruth Strong. The Minister from France: Conrad-Alexandre Gérard, 1729–1790. Lutz, 1994. 279 pp.
 Hutson, James H. John Adams and the Diplomacy of the American Revolution (1980)
 Kennett, Lee. The French Forces in America, 1780–1783.Greenwood, 1977. 188 pp.
 Kramer, Lloyd. Lafayette in Two Worlds: Public Cultures and Personal Identities in an Age of Revolutions. (1996). 355 pp.
 Morris, Richard B. "The Great Peace of 1783," Massachusetts Historical Society Proceedings (1983) Vol. 95, pp 29–51.
 Morris, Richard B. The Peacemakers: The Great Powers and American Independence (1975)
 Perkins, James Breck. France in the American Revolution 1911 online
 Popofsky, Linda S. and Sheldon, Marianne B. "French and American Women in the Age of Democratic Revolution, 1770–1815: a Comparative Perspective." History of European Ideas1987 8(4–5): 597–609. 
 Pritchard, James. "French Strategy and the American Revolution: a Reappraisal." Naval War College Review 1994 47(4): 83–108. 
 Schaeper, Thomas J. France and America in the Revolutionary Era: The Life of Jacques-Donatien Leray de Chaumont, 1725–1803. Berghahn Books, 1995. 384 pp. He provided military supplies.
 
 Unger, Harlow Giles. Lafayette Wiley, 2002 online
 Van Tyne, C. H. "Influences which Determined the French Government to Make the Treaty with America, 1778," American Historical Review (1916) 21#3 pp. 528–541 
 Van Tyne, C. H. "French Aid Before the Alliance of 1778," American Historical Review (1925) 31#1 pp. 20–40

Primary sources
 Lafayette, Marquis de. Lafayette in the Age of the American Revolution: Selected Letters and Papers, 1776–1790. Vol. 2: April 10, 1778–March 20, 1780. Cornell U. Press, 1979. 518 pp.

French
 Susan Mary Alsop, Les Américains à la cour de Louis XVI, 1982. Traduction française : Jean-Claude Lattès (1983).
 Henri Haeau, Complot pour l'Amérique 1775–1779, Paris, Éditions Robert Laffont, 1990, 
 J.-M. Bizière et J. Sole, Dictionnaire des Biographies, Paris, Éditions du Seuil, 1993.
 Olivier Chaline, La France au XVIIIe siècle (1715–1787), Paris, Éditions Belin, 1996.
 Joël Cornette, Absolutisme et Lumière 1652–1783, collection Carré Histoire, Paris, Éditions Hachette, 2000. 
 Jean Egret, Necker, ministre de Louis XVI, 1776–1790, Honoré Champion; Paris, 1975.
 André Zysberg, La Monarchie des Lumières (1775–1786), Paris, Éditions du Seuil, 2002.

American Revolutionary War
France–United States relations
Military history of France
Wars involving France